Gouverneur may refer to:

People
Gouverneur Kemble (1786–1875), U.S. congressman, diplomat, and industrialist
Gouverneur K. Warren (1830–1882), engineer and Union Army general during American Civil War
Gouverneur Morris (1752–1816), American statesman and Founding Father
Gouverneur Morris Jr. (1813–1888), New York entrepreneur and son of Gouverneur Morris
Gouverneur Morris (novelist) (1876–1953), American author
Gouverneur Frank Mosher (1871–1941), Episcopal missionary bishop of the Philippines
R. Gouverneur, French physician after whom Gouverneur's syndrome is named
Samuel L. Gouverneur (1799–1865), lawyer and civil servant
Sandra Gouverneur (born 1976), Dutch softball player
Véronique Gouverneur (born 1964), professor of chemistry

Places
Gouverneur Island, an island in southern Antarctica
Gouverneur, New York, a town in New York
Gouverneur (village), New York, a village in New York
Gouverneur, Saint Barthélemy, an area on the Caribbean island of Saint Barthélemy

Other
Gouverneur Health, New York healthcare facility
Gouverneur Wesleyan Seminary, seminary in New York
Gouverneur's syndrome, medical condition
Hoffmann Gouverneur, see Hoffmann (motorcycle)